The Caravan Trail is a 1946 American Western film directed by Robert Emmett Tansey and written by Frances Kavanaugh. The film stars Eddie Dean, Lash LaRue, Emmett Lynn, Jean Carlin, Robert Malcolm and Charles King. The film was released on April 20, 1946, by Producers Releasing Corporation.

Plot

Cast          
Eddie Dean as Eddie Dean
Lash LaRue as Cherokee 
Emmett Lynn as Ezra
Jean Carlin as Paula Bristol
Robert Malcolm as Jim Bristol
Charles King as Reno
Robert Barron as Joe King
Forrest Taylor as Judge Silas Black
Bob Duncan as Poker Face
Jack O'Shea as Killer
Terry Frost as Bart Barton

References

External links
 

1946 films
1940s English-language films
American Western (genre) films
1946 Western (genre) films
Producers Releasing Corporation films
Films directed by Robert Emmett Tansey
1940s American films